Yefim Georgievich Yevdokimov (– 2 February 1940) was a Soviet politician and member of the Cheka and OGPU. He was a key figure in the Red Terror, the Great Purge and dekulakization that saw millions of people executed and deported.

Yevdokimov himself was arrested on 9 November 1938 and executed 2 February 1940. He was posthumously rehabilitated in 1956.

Biography
Yevdokimov was born in Kopal, Semirechye Oblast, Russian Empire (now Qapal, Kazakhstan). His father, Georgy Savvateyevich Yevdokimov, was a peasant from Kursk who joined the Semirechye Cossacks. In Semirechye he married a young peasant, Anastasia Arkhipovna. After Yefim was born in 1891, the family moved to Chita. According to one source, he joined the Polish Socialist Party in 1907, but was an anarcho-syndicalist from 1911. 

Yevdokimov was in prison at the time of the 1917 revolution, reputedly as a criminal rather than for political reasons, but was freed by the revolution, and joined the Cheka. In the late 1920s, he was chief of the OGPU in the North Caucasus region, based in Rostov. In this capacity he is reputed to have initiated the purge that culminated in the Shakhty Trial, in May 1928, the first Stalinist show trial, against the wishes of his superior, Vyacheslav Menzhinsky. He was in charge of forcing the 55 defendants to confess and ensuring they would not withdraw their confessions in court. Barred from further promotion in the secret police, he switched to party work as First Secretary of the North Caucasus Regional Committee of the CPSU in January 1934. 

Early in the Great Purge, in January 1937, after a redrawing of regional boundaries, Yevdokimov was appointed First Secretary of the Azov-Black Sea Territorial Party Committee, after the incumbent was sacked for allowing former oppositionists to hold jobs in the region. The following month, he told a plenum of the   Central Committee that "vile double-dealers" had "wormed their way" into responsible positions in the region, in order to pursue "counter-revolutionary aims." He also denounced the former head of the NKVD for allegedly preventing him from taking action against members of the opposition within the communist party, saying: "You, Yagoda, were once my boss: what help did I get from you?" After Yagoda's arrest, Stalin proposed that Yevdokimov take over the task of forcing a confession out of Yagoda.

Yevdokimov conducted a sweeping purge of the party and police apparatus in the Azov region. This included having friends of the writer Mikhail Sholokhov arrested. He also twice asked Stalin for permission to have Sholokhov arrested, but was refused. In February 1938, Sholokhov wrote to Stalin complaining that Yevdokimov was a "crafty, lame old fox" and either an enemy of the people or "a sorry old geezer." 

On 4 May 1938, he was transferred to Moscow as Deputy People's Commissar for Water Transport, under N.I.Yezhov, but was arrested on 9 November 1938, along with his wife, Maria, and teenage son, Yuri, after Lavrenti Beria had wrestled control of the secret police from Yezhov. He held out for five months before being forced to confess to having plotted to assassinate Stalin and others. On 16 January 1940, Yevdokimov, his wife, and 19-year-old son were all included with Yezhov, the writer Isaac Babel, on a list drawn up by Beria of 346 people who were to be executed.  He was shot on 2 February 1940 at the Kommunarka shooting ground. 

Yevdokimov was rehabilitated on 17 March 1956.

Family 
Yevdokimov's wife, Marina, was arrested on the same day as her husband, accused of counter-revolutionary activity, tried on 26 January 1940, and shot the following day. Their son, Yuir, who was born in Kharkov in 1920, was arrested several months after his parents, on 12 April 1939, and tried an executed on the same day as his mother.

Honours and awards
 Order of Lenin
 Order of the Red Banner (1930)
 Order of the Red Banner (1928)
 Order of the Red Banner (1923)
 Order of the Red Banner (1921)

On 19 July 1935, the village of Medvezhensky (now Krasnogvardeyskoye, Stavropol Krai) was renamed "Yevdokimovsky" in honor of Yevdokimov, the first secretary of the North Caucasus Krai. After Yevdokimov's arrest as an "enemy of the people" in 1938, the town was renamed "Molotov" in honor of Vyacheslav Molotov.

See also 
 The Great Purge

References

1891 births
1940 deaths
Cheka officers
People from Almaty Region
People from Semirechye Oblast
Old Bolsheviks
Central Committee of the Communist Party of the Soviet Union members
First convocation members of the Soviet of the Union
Recipients of the Order of Lenin
Recipients of the Order of the Red Banner
Members of the Communist Party of the Soviet Union executed by the Soviet Union
Politicide perpetrators
Great Purge victims from Kazakhstan
Soviet rehabilitations